Joseph Casimiere Rutgens (born January 26, 1939) is a former American football defensive tackle in the National Football League for the Washington Redskins.  He went to two Pro Bowls during his nine-year career.  He played college football at the University of Illinois at Urbana-Champaign and was drafted in the first round (third overall) of the 1961 NFL Draft.  Rutgens was also selected in the first round (fourth overall) of the 1961 AFL Draft by the Oakland Raiders.

In 2008 Rutgens was selected as one of the top 10 defensive lineman in the history of University of Illinois Memorial Stadium.

Rutgens was an All-American in 1960 and was a first-team All-Big Ten selection by the Associated Press in 1959 and 1960. He also was a second-team All-Big Ten pick by United Press in both 1959 and 1960.

References

1939 births
Living people
American football defensive tackles
Eastern Conference Pro Bowl players
Illinois Fighting Illini football players
People from Cedar Point, Illinois
Washington Redskins players